William Pope Duval (September 4, 1784 – March 19, 1854) was the first civilian governor of the Florida Territory, succeeding Andrew Jackson, who had been a military governor. In his twelve-year governorship, from 1822 to 1834, he  divided Florida into four territories, established the local court system, and chose Tallahassee as the territory's capital because of its central location. Duval County, where Jacksonville is located, Duval Street in Key West, and Duval Street in Tallahassee are named for him.

Early life
William Duval was born to Major William Duval and Ann Pope in "Mansfield," Henrico County, Virginia (near present-day Richmond). At the age of 14, he left home and struck out on his own, settling in Bardstown, Kentucky. He began to study law and was admitted to the bar at age 19, in 1804. On October 3, 1804 (then 20), he married Nancy Hynes, daughter of Colonel Andrew Hynes, in Bardstown.

Congressional service
During an outbreak of Indian hostilities in 1812, Duval was given command of a company of mounted volunteers. This service and his law experience helped to win him election to the 13th Congress of the United States in 1812. He served as a representative from the Democratic-Republican Party in the new 10th Congressional District of Kentucky until 1815, when he did not seek re-election. He returned to Kentucky and continued to practice law.

Territory of Florida
In 1821, Florida became a U.S. territory. Duval was named U.S. Judge for the East Florida district on May 18, 1821. On April 17, 1822, President James Monroe appointed him as the first non-military governor of the territory, succeeding Gen. Andrew Jackson. In addition, Most Worshipful William Pope Duval was elected the first Grand Master of the Grand Lodge of Florida, Free and Accepted Masons in 1830.

He was reappointed by presidents John Quincy Adams and Andrew Jackson. During his twelve-year administration, he selected the small Indian village of Tallahassee as the site for the territory's capital, on account of its (north) central location. He was also known for his peaceful dealings with the Native Americans. He signed the first act of legislation in the Territory of Florida, dividing it into four sections and establishing the local court system.

Post-governorship
Duval continued to live in Florida for a number of years, practicing law. His former mansion burned in 1905, and the site now houses the Carnegie Library at FAMU. He moved to Texas in 1848. He and his wife had eight children, many of whom began families in Texas.

All three of his sons were distinguished Texans:  Burr Harrison Duval, Thomas Howard DuVal, and John Crittenden Duval. Thomas' daughter, Florence Duval West, was a poet.

William Pope Duval died in Washington, D.C.; his remains were interred at the Congressional Cemetery.

Legacy
Duval County, Florida, was named for him.
Duval County, Texas, was named for his son, Captain Burr H. Duval.
The World War II Liberty Ship  was named in his honor.

There are many roads in Florida named after him, the most well-known being Duval Street in Key West, Florida.

Washington Irving's character "Ralph Ringwood” and James K. Paulding's character "Nimrod Wildfire" were based on Duval.

References

External links
 Official Governor's portrait and biography from the State of Florida 
 Territorial Governor Duval's Message to Legislative Council, 1822  The message is in Duval's own handwriting; from the State Library and Archives of Florida.

William Pope Duval in the Handbook of Texas Online
 

Governors of Florida Territory
Burials at the Congressional Cemetery
1784 births
1854 deaths
Members of the Florida Territorial Legislature
Democratic-Republican Party members of the United States House of Representatives from Kentucky
19th-century American politicians
American lawyers admitted to the practice of law by reading law
People from Henrico County, Virginia
American slave owners